
Established in , the East Norwalk Historical Cemetery is Norwalk's oldest cemetery, and many of the area's first settlers are buried there. The cemetery is owned and maintained by the Third Taxing District, formally known as the East Norwalk Fire District of the Town of Norwalk, and before that it was known as the Down Town School District.
Triangle shaped and surrounded clockwise by Gregory Boulevard, Cemetery Street and East Avenue it is situated in the neighborhood of East Norwalk.  

At the north entrance of the grounds stands the First Settlers of Norwalk Memorial, inscribed with the following names of 31 settlers who founded Norwalk in 1649:

George Abbitt, Robert Beacham, Stephen Beckwith, John Bowton, Matthew Campfield, Nathaniel Eli, Thomas Fitch, John Griggorie, Samuel Hales, Thomas Hales, Walter Haite, Nathaniel Haies, Rev. Thomas Hanford, Richard Homes, Ralph Keiler, Daniel Kellogge, Thomas Lupton, Matthew Marvin, Sr.,  Matthew Marvin, Jr., Isacke More, Jonathan Marsh, Widow Morgan, Richard Olmsted, Nathaniel Richards, John Ruskoe, Matthias Sention, Sr., Matthias Sention, Jr., Matthew Sention, Thomas Seamer, Richard Webb, and Walter Keiler.

Many graves are unmarked by headstones as remains were deposited before stones were available, and of which no mark or tradition is known.

In 1843, the Down Town Cemetery Association was founded to maintain and conduct the business of the cemetery. In 1933, the name was changed to the East Norwalk Cemetery Association. In 1941, the Norwalk Third Taxing District entered into an agreement to supplement the association's perpetual care fund, due to a dwindling amount of donations. In 1966, the district took the deed to the land, so as to secure better insurance. Today, the district provides for the perpetual care of the grounds, while cemetery business is conducted by volunteers of the association.

Notable burials 

 John Bowton (1636–1707), founding settler of Norwalk
 John Copp (1673–1751), teacher, doctor, member of the Connecticut House of Representatives from Norwalk, purchaser and surveyor of Ridgefield, Connecticut, town clerk of Norwalk and Ridgefield, town treasurer and surveyor of Bedford
 Samuel Daskam (1823–1912), warden of the Borough of Norwalk from 1874 to 1877
 Thomas Fitch, Jr. (1612–1704), founding settler of Norwalk
 Thomas Fitch, IV (1699–1774), Governor of Connecticut
 Colonel Thomas Fitch (1725–1795), widely believed to be the original "Yankee Doodle" dandy
 Reverend Thomas Hanford (1621–1693), first minister of the colony, a flat brown stone marks the grave, however the inscription is obliterated
 John Gregory (1612–1689), founding settler of Norwalk
 Daniel Kellogg (1630–1688), founding settler of Norwalk
 Richard Olmsted (1612-1687), founding settler of Norwalk
 Matthew Marvin, Sr. (1600–1678), founding settler of Norwalk (no extant stone)
 Joseph Platt (1672–1748), longest serving state representative from Norwalk
 Matthias Sention, Sr. (1601–1669), founding settler of Norwalk
 Matthias Sention, Jr. (1628–1728), founding settler of Norwalk
 Samuel Smith (1646–1735), early settler of Norwalk, Connecticut and deputy of the General Assembly of the Colony of Connecticut from Norwalk in 1691
 Richard Webb (1580–1665), founding settler of Norwalk

See also 
 History of Norwalk, Connecticut
 Mill Hill Historic Park
 Pine Island Cemetery

Further reading 
 David H. VanHoosear, A Complete Copy of the Inscriptions found on the Monuments, Headstones, &c in the Oldest Cemetery in Norwalk CT, The Standard Association, Printers; 1895
 Harold Secor-Martin, Records of the East Norwalk Historical Cemetery of CT, Self Published by Third Taxing District; 1971)

References

External links

Cemeteries in Fairfield County, Connecticut
History of Norwalk, Connecticut
1655 establishments in Connecticut
Buildings and structures in Norwalk, Connecticut